Stephanomeria elata is a species of flowering plant in the family Asteraceae known by the common names Santa Barbara wirelettuce and Nuttall's wirelettuce. It is native to Oregon and California, where it grows in coastal and inland mountain ranges, including the Sierra Nevada. It can be found in many types of habitat. It is an annual herb producing a slender, erect stem often exceeding one meter in maximum height. It is hairy to hairless and often glandular. The leaves are mostly located in a basal rosette, the largest reaching 10 centimeters long. Smaller, much-reduced leaves occur farther up the stem. The leaves drop early, leaving the plant naked for most of the year. Flowers occur singly or in small clusters along the stiff branches. Each head contains up to 15 or 16 ray florets, each with an elongated tube and a pink ligule 6 or 7 millimeters long. The fruit is an achene tipped with a spreading cluster of long, plumelike pappus bristles.

References

External links
Jepson Manual Treatment
Flora of North America
Photo gallery

elata
Flora of California
Flora of Oregon
Flora without expected TNC conservation status